The 55th Directors Guild of America Awards, honoring the outstanding directorial achievements in films, documentary and television in 2002, were presented on March 1, 2003 at the Hyatt Regency Century Plaza. The ceremony was hosted by Carl Reiner. The nominees in the feature film category were announced on January 21, 2003 and the other nominations were announced starting on January 30, 2003.

Winners and nominees

Film

Television

Commercials

Lifetime Achievement in Feature Film
 Martin Scorsese

Frank Capra Achievement Award
 Yudi Bennett

Robert B. Aldrich Service Award
 Jud Taylor

Franklin J. Schaffner Achievement Award
 Esperanza Martinez

Honorary Life Member
 John Rich

References

External links
 

2002 film awards
2002 television awards
Directors Guild of America Awards
Direct
Direct
Directors
Direct
2003 in Los Angeles
March 2003 events in the United States